The Greater Jacksonville Open was a PGA Tour event that was played from 1945 until 1976.

Shortly after World War II, the Jacksonville Open began play as a PGA Tour event in Jacksonville, Florida at the Hyde Park Golf Club until it was discontinued in the mid-1950s. In the mid-1960s, the PGA Tour came to town again. This time the event was initially named the Jacksonville Open again and changed for the 1968 event to the Jacksonville Open Invitational. The name was changed to the Greater Jacksonville Open for the 1969 event.

The Greater Jacksonville Open was discontinued after the 1976 tournament when the PGA Tour decided to relocate The Players Championship to Ponte Vedra Beach, Florida. The PGA Tour had been looking for some time for a permanent home for the marquee event which has professional golf's highest prize fund and is sometimes referred to as the "fifth major". The Players Championship had been played at the Atlanta Country Club in Marietta, Georgia in 1974, the Colonial Country Club in Fort Worth in 1975 and at the Inverrary Country Club in Ft. Lauderdale in 1976. The Greater Jacksonville Open laid the groundwork and provided much of the infrastructure for the modern Players Championship, which was first played in Ponte Vedra Beach in 1977.

Tournament highlights
1947: During his third round, Ben Hogan scores eleven on the par-3 6th hole.
1952: At the end of regulation play, Doug Ford and Sam Snead were tied for the lead. An 18-hole playoff was scheduled for the next day but rather than play, Snead forfeited. The forfeit stemmed from a ruling Snead received during the tournament's second round of play. On the 10th hole, Snead's drive landed behind an out of bounds stake. While Chick Harbert who was playing with Snead thought the ball was out of bounds, a rules official ruled differently due to the starter not telling players the stakes had been moved since the previous day's play had ended. Afterwards Snead explained why he forfeited even though Ford suggested they play sudden death for the title. "I want to be fair about it. I don't want anyone to think I took advantage of the ruling."  
1965: Bert Weaver wins the first modern version of the tournament. He finishes one shot ahead of Bruce Devlin, Jack Nicklaus, Bob Charles, and Dave Marr.
1966: Jack Nicklaus makes a double eagle on the tournament's final hole but can finish no better than tied for eighth. Doug Sanders is the winner by one shot over Gay Brewer.
1967: Jacksonville native Dan Sikes wins by one shot over Bill Collins.
1968: Tony Jacklin becomes the first English golfer to win on the PGA Tour. He finishes two shots ahead of DeWitt Weaver, Chi-Chi Rodríguez, Doug Sanders, and Don January.
1972: Tony Jacklin takes home his second Jacksonville title via a sudden death playoff win over John Jacobs. No Englishman would win a PGA Tour event on US soil again till Nick Faldo triumphed at the 1983 Sea Pines Heritage.
1975: Larry Ziegler shoots a final round 65 to win by two shots over Mike Morley and Mac McLendon. 
1976: Hubert Green wins the last edition of the tournament. He finishes two shots ahead of Miller Barber.

Winners

References

External links
Tournament results (1970–76) at GolfObserver.com

Former PGA Tour events
Golf in Florida
Sports competitions in Jacksonville, Florida
Recurring sporting events established in 1945
Recurring sporting events disestablished in 1976
1945 establishments in Florida
1976 disestablishments in Florida